German submarine U-520 was a Type IXC U-boat of Nazi Germany's Kriegsmarine during World War II. The U-boat was laid down on 1 July 1941 at the Deutsche Werft yard in Hamburg as yard number 335, launched on 2 March 1942 and commissioned on 19 May 1942 under the command of Kapitänleutnant Volkmar Schwartzkopff. After training with the 4th U-boat Flotilla, she was transferred to the 2nd flotilla for front-line service on 1 October 1942.

Design
German Type IXC submarines were slightly larger than the original Type IXBs. U-520 had a displacement of  when at the surface and  while submerged. She had two shafts and two  propellers.

U-520 was fitted with six  torpedo tubes (four fitted at the bow and two at the stern), 22 torpedoes, one  SK C/32 naval gun, 180 rounds, and a  SK C/30 as well as a  C/30 anti-aircraft gun. The boat had a complement of forty-eight.

Service history

U-520 sailed from Kiel on 3 October 1942, negotiated the gap between the Faeroe and Shetland Islands and then turned west toward Cape Farewell, (the southern tip of Greenland). After a brief journey in the direction of Iceland, she headed southwest, then south, before being sunk east of Newfoundland in position  by depth charges from a Canadian Douglas Digby light bomber of No. 10 Squadron RCAF on 30 October 1942. None of her 53 crew members survived the sinking.

In January 2006 an article in the Edmonton Journal reported that a team of divers planned to search for U-520 and another U-boat, .

References

Bibliography

External links

German Type IX submarines
U-boats commissioned in 1942
U-boats sunk in 1942
U-boats sunk by depth charges
U-boats sunk by Canadian aircraft
World War II submarines of Germany
World War II shipwrecks in the Atlantic Ocean
Shipwrecks of the Newfoundland and Labrador coast
1942 ships
Ships built in Hamburg
Ships lost with all hands
Maritime incidents in October 1942